Catherynne M. Valente (born May 5, 1979) is an American fiction writer, poet, and literary critic. For her speculative fiction novels she has won the annual James Tiptree, Andre Norton, and Mythopoeic Fantasy awards. Her short fiction has appeared in Clarkesworld Magazine, the World Fantasy Award–winning anthologies Salon Fantastique and Paper Cities, along with numerous "Year's Best" volumes. Her critical work has appeared in the International Journal of the Humanities as well as in numerous essay collections.

Career
Valente's 2009 book Palimpsest won the Lambda Award for LGBT Science Fiction or Fantasy. Her two-volume series The Orphan's Tales won the 2008 Mythopoeic Award, and its first volume, The Orphan's Tales: In the Night Garden, won the 2006 James Tiptree Jr. Award and was nominated for the 2007 World Fantasy Award. In 2012, Valente won three Locus Awards: Best Novelette (White Lines on a Green Field), Best Novella (Silently and Very Fast) and Best YA Novel (The Girl Who Circumnavigated Fairyland in a Ship of Her Own Making).

In 2011, her children's novel The Girl Who Circumnavigated Fairyland in a Ship of Her Own Making debuted at #8 on the New York Times Best Seller List. Its sequel, The Girl Who Fell Beneath Fairyland and Led the Revels There, featured at #5 on Time Best Fiction of 2012 list.

In 2009, she donated her archive to the Science Fiction and Fantasy Writers of America (SFWA) Collection in the department of Rare Books and Special Collections at Northern Illinois University.

She is a regular panelist on the podcast SF Squeecast.

Multimedia and mythpunk
Valente tours with singer/songwriter S. J. Tucker, who has composed albums based on Valente's work. The pair perform reading concerts featuring dancers, aerial artists, art auctions featuring jewelry and paintings based on the novels, and other performances.

Valente is active in the crowdfunding movement of online artists, and her novel The Girl Who Circumnavigated Fairyland in a Ship of Her Own Making was the first online, crowdfunded book to win a major literary award before traditional publication.

In a 2006 blog post, Valente coined the term mythpunk as a joke for describing her own and other works of challenging folklore-based fantasy. Valente and other critics and writers have discussed mythpunk as a subgenre of mythic fiction that starts in folklore and myth and adds elements of postmodernist literary techniques.

Selected works

Novels
The Labyrinth (2004)
The Ice Puzzle (2004)
Yume No Hon: The Book of Dreams (2005)
The Grass-Cutting Sword (2006)
Palimpsest (2009)
Deathless (2011)
Radiance (2015)
The Glass Town Game (2017)
Space Opera (2018)
Mass Effect: Andromeda Annihilation (2018)
Comfort Me with Apples (2021)

Novellas
Silently and Very Fast (2011)
Six-Gun Snow White (2013)
Speak Easy (2015)
The Refrigerator Monologues (2017)
The Past Is Red (2021)

The Orphan's Tales

 The Orphan's Tales: In the Night Garden (vol. 1) (October 2006) 
 Book of the Steppe
 Book of the Sea
 The Orphan's Tales: In the Cities of Coin and Spice (vol. 2) (October 2007)
 Book of the Storm
 Book of the Scald

A Dirge for Prester John
Published by Night Shade Books:
 The Habitation of the Blessed (2010)
 The Folded World (2011)

Fairyland

Published by Feiwel & Friends:
Prequel: The Girl Who Ruled Fairyland—For a Little While (2011)
The Girl Who Circumnavigated Fairyland in a Ship of Her Own Making (2011) started out in 2009 as a crowdfunded middle-grade online novel (originally, a fictional children's book in Palimpsest).
The Girl Who Fell Beneath Fairyland and Led the Revels There (2012)
The Girl Who Soared Over Fairyland and Cut the Moon in Two (2013)
The Boy Who Lost Fairyland (2015)
The Girl Who Raced Fairyland All the Way Home (2016)

Anthologies edited
Nebula Awards Showcase 55 (2021)

Poetry
Music of a Proto-Suicide (2004)
Apocrypha (2005)
Oracles: A Pilgrimage (2006)
The Descent of Inanna (2006)
A Guide to Folktales in Fragile Dialects (May 2008)

Nonfiction
 Introduction to Jane Eyre (Illustrated) (2007)
 "Regeneration X" in Chicks Dig Time Lords (2010)
 Indistinguishable from Magic (2014)

Short fiction
"The Oracle Alone" Music of a Proto-Suicide (2004)
"Ghosts of Gunkanjima" Papaveria Press (2005)
"The Maiden-Tree" Cabinet des Fees (2005)
"Bones Like Black Sugar" Fantasy Magazine (2005)
"Psalm of the Second Body" PEN Book of Voices (2005)
"Ascent Is Not Allowed" The Minotaur in Pamplona (2005)
"Thread: A Triptych" Lone Star Stories (2006)
"Urchins, While Swimming" Clarkesworld Magazine (2006)
"Milk and Apples" Electric Velocipede (2006)
"Temnaya and the House of Books" Mythic (2006)
"A Grey and Soundless Tide" Salon Fantastique (2006)
"A Dirge For Prester John" Interfictions (2007)
"The Ballad of the Sinister Mr. Mouth" Lone Star Stories (2007)
"La Serenissima" Endicott Studio (2007)
"The Proslogium of the Great Lakes" Farrago's Wainscot (2007)
"A Buyer's Guide to Maps of Antarctica" Clarkesworld Magazine (2008)
"Tales of Beaty and Strangeness: City of Blind Delights" Clockwork Phoenix (2008)
"The Hanged Man" Farrago's Wainscot (2008)
"An Anthology of Urban Fantasy: Palimpsest" Paper Cities, ed. Ekaterina Sedia (2008)
"The Harpooner at the Bottom of the World" Spectra Pulse (2008)
"Golubash, or, Wine-War-Blood-Elegy" Federations (2009)
"The Secret History of Mirrors" Clockwork Phoenix 2 (2009)
"A Book of Villainous Tales:A Delicate Architecture" Troll's Eye View (2009)
"The Radiant Car Thy Sparrows Drew" Clarkesworld Magazine (2009)
"The Anachronist's Cookbook" Steampunk Tales (2009)
"A Between Books Anthology:Proverbs of Hell" The Stories in Between (2010)
"The Days of Flaming Motorcycles" Dark Faith (2010)
"Secretario" Weird Tales (2010)
"Thirteen Ways of Looking at Space/Time" Clarkesworld Magazine (2010)
"How to Become a Mars Overlord" Lightspeed (2010)
"15 Panels Depicting the Sadness of the Baku and the Jotai" Haunted Legends (2010)
"In the Future When All's Well" Teeth (2011)
"A Voice Like a Hole" Welcome to Bordertown (2011)
"The Wolves of Brooklyn" Fantasy Magazine (2011)
"The Girl Who Ruled Fairyland—For a Little While" Tor.com (2011)
"White Lines on a Green Field" Subterranean Magazine (2011)

Collections
This Is My Letter to the World: The Omikuji Project, Cycle One (2010)
Ventriloquism (2010)
Myths of Origin, Omnibus collection containing The Labyrinth, Yume No Hon: The Book of Dreams, The Grass-Cutting Sword, and Under in the Mere (2011)
The Melancholy of Mechagirl (2013)
The Bread We Eat in Dreams (2013)
The Future Is Blue (2018)

Awards

References

External links

 
 Blog

2010 Interview on the Geek's Guide to the Galaxy podcast
2007 Interview with Jay Tomio
 
Patreon page

1979 births
Living people
Postmodernists
21st-century American novelists
21st-century American poets
21st-century American short story writers
21st-century American women writers
American fantasy writers
American science fiction writers
American women poets
Women science fiction and fantasy writers
Lambda Literary Award winners
Hugo Award-winning writers
American women novelists
Writers from Seattle
Alumni of the University of Edinburgh
Rhysling Award for Best Long Poem winners
Novelists from Washington (state)